The Frontier Constabulary is a federal paramilitary force of Pakistan under the control of the Interior Secretary of Pakistan, which is largely drawn from Khyber Pakhtunkhwa province, but operates in several districts of Pakistan. It is responsible for maintaining law and order, and dealing with situations beyond the capabilities of the civilian Khyber Pakhtunkhwa Police. It also guards against tribal incursions, criminal gangs, and contraband smuggling.

The Frontier Constabulary was created in 1915 by amalgamating the Border Military Police (formed in 1852) and Samana Rifles (formed in 1879), during the British Raj. Both of the forces were guarding the border between the tribal areas and the then-settled areas of the North-West Frontier Province (after which it is named).

History 
The Frontier Constabulary was created as an independent Civil Armed Force, under the provisions of Frontier Constabulary Act, 1915. under this Act, Frontier Constabulary Rules 1958 were framed. This force is also under the administrative control of the Ministry of Interior. From an operational point of view, the functioning of this force is supervised by the Home departments of the respective provincial governments. The Frontier Constabulary, an armed police force, also operates in a small area bordering FATA and the settled districts. The KPK police does not have jurisdiction over FATA’s agencies or the Frontier Regions. Originally, it was aimed at stopping incursions and raids from the tribal areas. Now, its original function has been overshadowed by an increasing involvement in the internal security duties and protection of vital installation as well as embassies.

Organizational structure 
The Frontier Constabulary is headed by the Commandant, the equivalent of Inspector General of Police (BPS-22 grade) and is popularly referred to as the CFC. The Deputy Commandant is equivalent of Deputy Inspector General of Police; a District Officer is equivalent of Senior Superintendent of Police and an Assistant District Officer is the equivalent of Assistant Superintendent of Police. The senior hierarchy of FC is drawn from the Police Service of Pakistan.

Ranks

Area of responsibility 

FC accomplishes its basic function by dividing the area of responsibility into F.C districts which in turn have an intricate network of Forts, Posts and Pickets located strategically along the tribal settled border. With the passage of time, and additional duties assigned to FC, the geographical area covered by FC also increased. At present there are 17 FC districts stretching from Gilgit in the extreme north to Karachi in the extreme South of the country. Thus in all the provinces of Pakistan, except Punjab, FC is performing its duties. However, various FC platoons have also been deployed in Punjab for the security of sensitive installations and VVIPs.

Following are some major duties which are assigned to Frontier Constabulary:

 To guard the border between tribal and settled area.
 To stop tribal incursions in individual cases or in the form of gangs.
 To check outlaws and their evil designs in the area.
 To stop kidnapping and checking on tribal disputes on the administrative borders.
 To act as a second line of defense in times of grave emergency.
 To assist the local administration in times of need (internal security).
 To control and eliminate poppy cultivation and growth.
 To check trafficking of narcotics, illegal weapons and smuggling.
 To perform any other duties assigned by the government.

Training facilities 

 FC Shabqadar. Located 40 km North of Peshawar created in 1922. Capacity 700 recruits.
 FC Hayatabad. Located 15 km West of Peshawar. Created in 1985 but Training facility started in 2009 due to occupation of FC Training Centre Swat at Kanju by Army. Capacity 500 recruits.

Former commandants of the Frontier Constabulary  
 R.C Boyle Esq. C.I.E (1912–1921)
 E.C Handyside Esq. C.I.E OBE (1921–1926)
 A.F Perrott Esq. LP (1926–1926)
 AV Short Esq. CIE (1926–1928)
 B.C.A Lawather Esq. I.P (1928–1928)
 H. Lillie Esq. (1933–1935)
 AV Short Esq., CIE (1935–1936)
 K.B.T Mohammad Khan B.A.I.P (1936–1936)
 G. Gilbert Grace, Esq. C.I.E. OBE. (1937–1944)
 H.F Scroggie Esq. OBE (1947–1948)
 S.A Rashid OBE, P.S.C. (1948–1951)
 Nawabzada Mohammad Farid Khan PSP (1952–1953)
 Mohammad Anwar Afridi PSP (1953–1955)
 Pir Sarwar Shah B.A. LLB. P.S.C. (1956–1958)
 Muzaffar Khan Bangash, TQA, PPM, PSC (1969–1970)
 Shafi Ullah Khan PSP (1971–1972)
 Mohammad Jaseem Khan (1972–1978)
 Dil Jan Khan S.B.T (1978–1980)
 Syed Saadat Ali Shah (1980–1982)
 Muhammad Abbas Khan (1983–1986)
 Gohar Zaman Khan Mohmand (1986–1988)
 Muhammad Aziz Khan (1988–1991)
 M. Saeed Khan (1991–1995)
 Afzal Ali Shigri (1995–1996)
 Syed Kamal Shah (1996–1997)
 Muhammad Aziz Khan (1997–1997)
 M. Saeed Khan (1997–1999)
 Syed Kamal Shah (1999–2000)
 Israr Mohammad Khan Shinwari (2000–2005)
 Sikandar Mohammadzai (2005–2006)
 Malik Naveed Khan (2006–2008)
 Zafarullah Khan PSP, PPM (Bar) (2008–2009)
 Safwat Ghayur PSP, SJ (2009–2010)
 Akbar Khan Hoti PSP (2010–2011)
 Abdul Majeed Khan Marwat PSP (2011–2014)
 Liaqat Ali Khan PSP, (2014–2018)
 Moazzam Jah Ansari PSP, QPM, UNPM (2018–2021)

References

External links

 

Federal law enforcement agencies of Pakistan
Gendarmerie
Civil Armed Forces